Allotinus portunus is a butterfly in the family Lycaenidae. It was described by Lionel de Nicéville in 1894. It is found in Southeast Asia.

Subspecies
Allotinus portunus portunus (Java)
Allotinus portunus maitus Fruhstorfer, 1914 (Sumatra, western Malaysia)
Allotinus portunus pyxus (de Nicéville, 1894) (Borneo: Mount Kina Balu)

References

Butterflies described in 1894
Allotinus
Butterflies of Borneo
Butterflies of Asia